Lee Won-Jun (이원준, born. April 2, 1972, in South Korea) is a South Korean footballer. He is currently caretaker manager of FC Seoul.

Club career
He played for FC Seoul, then known as Anyang LG Cheetahs.

Honours
 FA Cup: 1998

References
 

1972 births
Living people
South Korean footballers
FC Seoul players
FC Seoul managers
FC Seoul non-playing staff
K League 1 players
Chung-Ang University alumni
Association football midfielders